Boyd Tavern or Boyd's Tavern may refer to:
Boyd Tavern (Albemarle County, Virginia)
Boyd Tavern, Virginia, a community near the above tavern
Boyd's Tavern (Mecklenburg County, Virginia)